The Federal Medical and Dental College (abbreviated as FMDC) is a medical school located in Islamabad, Pakistan. The college gives admission to 110 (including 10 goodwill seats for Afghanistan) Bachelor of Medicine and Bachelor of Surgery (MBBS) students each year. FMDC is a constituent college of Shaheed Zulfiqar Ali Bhutto Medical University. The college has started its BDS degree.

Recognition

FMDC is recognized by the Pakistan Medical and Dental Council and Ministry of National Health Services Regulation and Coordination. The college is listed in the International Medical Education Directory (IMED) and WHO Directory of Medical Schools. It has two attached teaching hospitals; Federal General Hospital  and Pakistan Institute of Medical Sciences.

Departments 

FMDC includes the following departments:

 Department of Anatomy
 Department of Physiology
 Department of Biochemistry
 Department of Pharmacology
 Department of Pathology
 Department of Community & Public Health Sciences
 Department of Forensic Medicine & Toxicology

See also

Shaheed Zulfiqar Ali Bhutto Medical University

References

External links
 FMDC official website

Medical colleges in Islamabad
Dental schools in Pakistan
Universities and colleges in Islamabad